Dart Lake is a lake northwest of Eagle Bay in Herkimer County, New York. The North Branch Moose River flows through the lake.

See also
 List of lakes in New York

References 

Lakes of New York (state)
Lakes of Herkimer County, New York